Ilija Ničić (21 July 1922 – 27 April 2014) was a Serbian sport shooter who competed in the 50 metre pistol event at the 1960 Summer Olympics.

References

1922 births
2014 deaths
Serbian male sport shooters
Yugoslav male sport shooters
ISSF pistol shooters
Olympic shooters of Yugoslavia
Shooters at the 1960 Summer Olympics
Sportspeople from Niš